A Portrait of an Ugly Man is the third studio album by Remo Drive, released on June 26, 2020 on Epitaph Records.

Background
A Portrait of an Ugly Man was recorded from 2019 to 2020, shortly after the release of their second studio album, Natural, Everyday Degradation. On April 28, 2020, Remo Drive released the first single from the album; "Star Worship". They announced the album and launched preorders for it the same day. On May 18, the second single from the album, "Ode to Joy 2", was released. On June 17, "A Flower and a Weed" was released as the third single from the album.

Critical reception

A Portrait of an Ugly Man was met with generally favorable reviews from critics. At Metacritic, which assigns a weighted average rating out of 100 to reviews from mainstream publications, this release received an average score of 64, based on 6 reviews.

Track listing
Track listing adapted from Apple Music.

Personnel
Erik Paulson – lead vocals, guitar, keyboards, aux percussion, production 
Stephen Paulson – bass guitar, programming
Sam Becht – drums

References

2020 albums
Remo Drive albums
Epitaph Records albums